Philip Christopher Bolland (born 26 August 1976) is an English former footballer, who played as a centre back.

Career
Bolland enjoyed two spells at Chester City, having signed from Peterborough United in the summer of 2006 – just a few months after he'd moved in the opposite direction. Mark Wright has managed him at the four clubs he has been in charge of, namely Southport, Oxford, Chester and Peterborough. Bolland had earlier played in non-league football for clubs including Altrincham, Salford City, Trafford and Knowsley United.

Bolland struggled to stake a place in the first-team side at Chester under new manager Bobby Williamson in 2007–08, making just three appearances. He spent time on trial with Wrexham and it was announced in December 2007 he was no longer part of Chester's plans.

On 8 January 2008 it was announced Bolland had been released by Chester and he quickly agreed terms with Wrexham. He was released by Wrexham in May 2008 following the club's relegation to the Football Conference and signed for Cambridge United on 31 July 2008 where he would be reunited with former teammates Gary Brabin and Paul Carden, manager and assistant manager of the Conference side. He spent one season at Cambridge, before signing for Barrow AFC, also of the Conference National.

Bolland won the FA Trophy with Barrow in the 2009–10 season. In May 2011 he was offered a new contract by Barrow and became the club captain. He had a full further season at Barrow, but was released at the end of the 2011–12 season, having played over 100 league matches for the club. He then joined Droylsden.

In January 2013, it was announced that Bolland had joined Airbus UK. After helping Airbus qualify for the Europa League in his final two seasons, Bolland announced he was retiring from playing to concentrate on his physiotherapy career with Liverpool.

Honours
Chester City
Football Conference champions: 2003–04
Southport
FA Trophy runners-up: 1997–98
Barrow AFC
FA Trophy winners: 2009–10

References

External links

Profile at UpThePosh! The Peterborough United Database
Player profile at the Welsh Premier League's official website 

1976 births
Living people
English footballers
Footballers from Liverpool
Association football defenders
Southport F.C. players
Altrincham F.C. players
Oxford United F.C. players
Chester City F.C. players
Peterborough United F.C. players
Wrexham A.F.C. players
Salford City F.C. players
Cambridge United F.C. players
English Football League players
National League (English football) players
Barrow A.F.C. players
Droylsden F.C. players
FC Halifax Town players
Knowsley United F.C. players
Airbus UK Broughton F.C. players
Trafford F.C. players
Liverpool F.C. non-playing staff